Invincible Guns (Spanish: Pistolas invencibles) is a 1960 Mexican western film directed by Benito Alazraki and starring Elvira Quintana, Armando Silvestre and Roberto G. Rivera.

Cast
 Elvira Quintana as Carmen Montenegro  
 Armando Silvestre as Pancho Corona  
 Roberto G. Rivera as Salvador Jiménez (Chava)  
 José Elías Moreno 
 Emma Roldán as Tía Juana  
 José Eduardo Pérez as Toro  
 Emilio Garibay 
 Alfonso Arnold
 José Chávez 
 Julián de Meriche 
 Agustín Fernández as Esbirro del toro  
 Magda Monzón as Mujer de Julio  
 Rubén Márquez as Hombre en cantina  
 Ramón Sánchez as Esbirro del toro 
 Hernán Vera

References

Bibliography 
 Emilio García Riera. Historia documental del cine mexicano: 1959–1960. Universidad de Guadalajara, 1994.

External links 
 

1960 films
1960 Western (genre) films
Mexican Western (genre) films
1960s Spanish-language films
Films directed by Benito Alazraki
1960s Mexican films